Swami Bodhananda Saraswati (born 27 March 1948) is an Indian spiritual leader and teacher of meditation, Yoga and Vedanta. He is the Spiritual Founder and Chairman of the Sambodh Foundation in India, The Sambodh Society Inc. USA, Sambodh Center for Human Excellence (Michigan), and the Bodhananda Research Foundation for Management and Leadership Studies.

He is a native of Kochi. He traveled to the Himalayas after his studies to learn Advaita. He then setup his own research institution in Delhi. He teaches about Advaita, meditation and management.

His publications in the area of Indian management are based on Indian philosophical theories on personality, self unfoldment, as explained in the Bhagavad Gita and other Indian wisdom texts. He develops a theory of transcendental leadership that emphasizes the human possibilities. A recent author describes Bodhananda's use of guna theory creating an Indian theory of mind, going beyond management concerns. On the impact of yoga on the emotional intelligence of managers, Swami Bodhananda believes that "it is very important to live in constant awareness of oneself so that one has power over one’s thoughts, and can choose responses to the world as per one’s values

Books 

Bodhananda has authored the following books in the area of Indian philosophy, Yoga, Vedanta and Indian management.

1998 - The Gita and Management, Sambodh Foundation

1998 - Management lessons from Patanjali’s yoga sutras: Inspirations from Indian wisdom for management, Ahmdebad: Ahmedabad Management Association

2003 - Dialogues: Philosopher meets the Seer, Srishti Publishers, 

2003 - Happiness Unlimited: Self Unfoldment in an Interactive World, Srishti Publishers, 

2004 - The Seven Hindu Spiritual Laws, 

2004 - Meditation: The Awakening of Inner Powers, Srishti Publishers, 

2004 - The Gita and Management, Srishti Publishers (revised edition), 

2007 - Indian Management and Leadership: Spiritual and Ethical Values for Corporate and Personal Success, Srishti Publishers, 

2007 - A Conversation with Lord Krishna : Five Spiritual Questions of Arjuna, 

2011 - Hindu Dharma for the Twenty-first Century: Interpretations, Innovations and Issues, The Sambodh Society Inc.

Statement Against Caste based Discrimination 

He believes that "all human beings are expressions of the same DIVINITY and hence no discrimination based either on birth, color of the skin or socio-economic status is allowed by the Hindu Scriptures"

References

External links 
 www.sambodh.org
 www.sambodh.us
 https://chroniclingamerica.loc.gov/lccn/sn83045487/1916-09-21/ed-1/seq-29/#date1=1789&index=17&rows=20&words=Swami&searchType=basic&sequence=0&state=&date2=1918&proxtext=Swami&y=9&x=19&dateFilterType=yearRange&page=1

Indian self-help writers
1948 births
Living people